Birdcatcher (1833–1860), or Irish Birdcatcher, was a Thoroughbred racehorse and a leading sire.

Breeding
Foaled in 1833 at the Brownstown Stud, in Ireland, Birdcatcher was by the Irish Thoroughbred stallion Sir Hercules, who lost only once, in the St Leger Stakes in 1829. Birdcatcher's dam, Guiccioli, who had a successful career as a racehorse, foaled the chestnut colt when she was 10. She was also the granddam of another well-known racehorse, Selim, and dam to a full-brother of Birdcatcher, Faugh-a-Ballagh.

Description
Birdcatcher was said to have been small, only 15.3 hh, but he had an expressive head, a well-arched neck, and nicely sloping shoulder. His back was short and compact, his loin was deep, and his hindquarters were strong and muscular. His forearms and thighs were large and strong, and attached to fine, light legs. He had an elastic stride, that no doubt helped him to win as many races as he did.

Birdcatcher had a large star and narrow blaze, white halfway up to the hock on the left hind. He also had ticking, or white hairs scattered throughout his flanks and at the base of the tail. He passed this trait onto many offspring, including Daniel O'Rourke, so often that the marking came to be called to Birdcatcher ticks. This marking differs from the small white spots known as Birdcatcher spots, and from the dark spots called Bend-Or spots.

Racing career
William Disney bought the colt, and raced him once as a 2-year-old before beginning seriously as a three-year-old. The young Thoroughbred raced only at Curragh throughout his career. He broke his maiden at the Madrid Stakes, and then won the Milltown Stakes and fourteen-furlong Peel Stakes, and came second in the ten-furlong Wellington Stakes. His four-year-old career was also quite impressive, with a win in the Kildare and Wellington Stakes (where he walked over the finish line). He finished second after Harkaway in the Northumberland Handicap. In his final race, the Doris Stakes, Birdcatcher was unplaced.

The chestnut colt ended his career with 15 starts and 7 wins, before the horse went on to have a successful breeding career.

Race record
Two-year-old

 Paget Stakes at the Curragh, unplaced

Three-year-old ~raced exclusively at the Curragh
 Madrid Stakes: won, beating Maria (b.f. by Sir Hercules), Langford (br.c. by Sir Hercules), Quicksilver (b.c. by Memnon), and five other entries
 Miltown Stakes: won, beating Cushneiche (ch.c. by Roller)
 Wellington Stakes: came 2nd, after Maria, beating Whim (gr.f. by Drone), and eight others
 Challenge Stakes: 2nd, after Whim, beating Maria
 November Mulgrave Handicap: 3rd, after winner Water Witch (bl.f. by Sir Hercules) and Blackfoot (b.c. by Young Blacklock), beating Fusileer (ch.c. by The Colonel), Whim, and three other entries
 October Mulgrave Handicap: unplaced, won by Langford followed by Whim

Four-year-old  ~raced exclusively at the Curragh
 Kildare Stakes: won, beating Thump (b.c. Humphrey Clinker), Aigirio (gr.c. Roller), Quicksilver, and two others
 King's Plate: Croughpatrick (br.c. Blacklock) and five others
 Wellington Stakes: won (walked over)
 April Challenge Stakes: 2nd, after Blackfoot, beat four others
 King's Plate: 2nd to Freney
 King's Plate: 3rd, after winner Harkaway, and Gipsy (bl.f. Sir Hercules)
 September Challenge Stakes: 3rd, after winner Mercury (gr.c. Drone), and Austerlitz (br.c. Napoleon)
 Wellington Stakes: unplaced, won by Harkaway
 Doris Stakes: unplaced, won by Maria

Stud record
The stallion retired to stud at his place of foaling, Brownstown, beginning his breeding career as a five-year-old in 1838. Birdcatcher's first crop of foals did well, and he was moved to Barrow's Paddock in Newmarket for 1846 and 1847, before he was leased for 1848 and 1849 to Easby Abbey in Yorkshire. The stallion then returned home to Brownstown for 1850, and was sent back to England for the 1852 season, and returned home to Ireland for the 1859 season.

Birdcatcher's English offspring did well, and earned him the Champion Sire title for 1852 and 1856. He was among the top sires 15 times during his breeding career. Birdcatcher was the first Irish-bred stallion to sire winners of English classic races, including seven offspring accounting for three St. Leger wins, two One Thousand Guineas wins, and a win at the Derby and the Oaks. Birdcatcher also founded two male lines, one with Oxford, and another with The Baron, from whom most Thoroughbreds descend today.

Birdcatcher sired:

The death of Birdcatcher
Despite his success as a sire Birdcatcher met with an undeserved execution after he was unable to cover a mare.

His death was accounted by Patrick Connolly. "Among the mares sent to the son of Sir Hercules that year was Mr. Michael Dunne's Queen Bee. She was a mare of good size, and when Birdcatcher attempted to serve her, he failed to do so. Mr. Disney, who owned the stallion, thereupon decided that he should no longer survive. At once a messenger was dispatched to the local police station with orders to bring back with him a constable with a loaded gun, as a horse was required to be destroyed. The police officer – his name was Preston – reported himself to Mr. Disney, who gave the necessary directions for the destruction of Birdcatcher. The horse was placed on the brink of a sandpit situated on the flat opposite Conyngham Lodge, Curragh; without any ceremony he was shot and his carcass tumbled into the pit. Thus ended the career of a good racehorse and a mighty sultan at the age of twenty-seven years. His head was afterwards presented to the Royal College of Veterinary Surgeons, Dublin."

Pedigree

References

1833 racehorse births
1860 racehorse deaths
Racehorses bred in Ireland
Racehorses trained in Ireland
Thoroughbred family 11-d